Alfred Peter Powell (19 August 1908 – 21 April 1985) was an English cricketer.  Powell's batting and bowling styles are unknown.  He was born in Hampstead, London.  He was educated at Mill Hill School, where he represented the school cricket team.

Powell played his only first-class match for Middlesex in the 1927 County Championship against Surrey.  In this match, he was dismissed for a duck in both innings by Percy Fender.

Powell made his debut for Buckinghamshire in the 1932 Minor Counties Championship against Hertfordshire.  Powell played Minor counties cricket for Buckinghamshire from 1932 to 1937, which included 25 Minor Counties Championship matches.

References

External links
Alfred Powell at ESPNcricinfo
Alfred Powell at CricketArchive

1908 births
1985 deaths
People from Hampstead
Cricketers from Greater London
People educated at Mill Hill School
English cricketers
Middlesex cricketers
Buckinghamshire cricketers